Tim McMillan was a Canadian politician. He was elected to represent the electoral district of Lloydminster in the Legislative Assembly of Saskatchewan in the 2007 election and the 2011 election. He was a member of the Saskatchewan Party.

In the fall 2009 legislative session, McMillan introduced a private members bill to protect the wild ponies of the Bronson Forest, which is in his constituency.  The bill was called Bill No. 606, The Protection of the Wild Ponies of the Bronson Forest Act, 2009 (Saskatchewan).  It received royal assent on December 3, 2009.

In June 2010, he joined the provincial cabinet as Minister Responsible for Crown Investments Corporation, Saskatchewan Government Insurance, Information Services Corporation, and the Information Technology Office. In September 2010, he was also appointed as the Minister Responsible for Saskatchewan Liquor and Gaming Authority.

In May 2012, he was appointed as Minister Responsible for Energy and Resources, Tourism Saskatchewan, Trade and SaskEnergy Incorporated.

On September 30, 2014, McMillan left politics to take the position of president of the Canadian Association of Petroleum Producers.

Cabinet positions

References

Living people
Year of birth missing (living people)
People from Lloydminster
Members of the Executive Council of Saskatchewan
Saskatchewan Party MLAs
21st-century Canadian politicians